Metaphire is a genus of annelids belonging to the family Megascolecidae.

The species of this genus are found in Southeastern Asia.

Species:

Metaphire acincta 
Metaphire bifoliolare 
Metaphire biforatum

References

Annelids